Yonatan Mishraki (born 17 August 1984) is an Israeli politician, currently serving as a member of the Knesset for Shas.

Biography 
Mishraki was born and raised in Jerusalem. He studied at two yeshivas. A yeshiva in Kiryat Arba and the Mir Yeshiva.

Mishraki worked as the manager of Shas's caucus in the Jerusalem City Council, later advising several of the city's Deputy Mayors. In 2016, he was made a personal assistant of Aryeh Deri, and was later made the Ministry for the Periphery's chief of staff.

Mishraki was given the 72nd spot on Shas's electoral list ahead of the 2015 election. He was then given the 17th spot ahead of the April and September elections in 2019. The 16th spot ahead of the 2020 election, the 15th spot ahead of the 2021 election, and the 12th spot ahead of the 2022 election. Mishraki was not elected during this period, but entered the Knesset on 3 January 2023 as part of the Norwegian Law.

Personal life 
Mishraki is married, has two children and resides in Jerusalem.

References

External links

People from Jerusalem
Members of the 25th Knesset (2022–)
1984 births
Living people